The Most Rev. Mons. Victor Barnuevo Bendico is a clergyman, diocesan priest, prelate, theologian, philosopher, and liturgist of the Catholic Church in The Philippines who has been appointed as the Metropolitan Archbishop of Capiz, after serving as bishop of Baguio for five years.
In October 2016 Pope Francis appointed him as bishop of Baguio; he received his episcopal consecration in February 2017.

Within the Catholic Bishops’ Conference of the Philippines, he chairs the Episcopal Commission for the Liturgy.
In March 2023 Pope Francis appointed him as Metropolitan Archbishop of Capiz, replacing Jose Cardinal Advincula who was the current Metropolitan Archbishop of Manila since 2021.

References

1960 births
Living people